Bartholomäus Kalb (born 13 July 1949 in Mamming) is a German politician of the Christian Social Union in Bavaria (CSU).

Political career
In 1972, Kalb was elected to the municipal council of Künzing. From 1978 to 2002 he held the office of second mayor of the municipality. From 1978 to 1986, he was a member of the Bavarian Landtag.

From 1987 until 2017, Kalb served as a member of the Bundestag. He was a member of the Committee on Budgets of the Bundestag, a member of the Audit Committee (a subcommittee of the Committee on Budgets), a deputy member of the Finance Committee, as well as a member of the Federal Funding body.

In the negotiations to form a coalition government of the Christian Democrats (CDU together with the Bavarian CSU) and the Free Democratic Party (FDP) in 2009, Kalb was part of the CDU/CSU delegation in the working group on taxes and finances, led by Thomas de Maizière and Hermann Otto Solms. Later, in the negotiations to form a Grand Coalition of the Christian Democrats and the Social Democrats (SPD) following the 2013 federal elections, he was again part of the CDU/CSU delegation in the working group on financial policy and the national budget, this time led by Wolfgang Schäuble and Olaf Scholz.

Other activities
 Federal Financial Supervisory Authority (BaFin), Member of the Administrative Council (2002-2017)
 KfW, Member of the Board of Supervisory Directors (since 2003)
 Sparkasse Deggendorf, Member of the Supervisory Board (since 1998)
 German Transport Infrastructure Financing Company (VIFG), Member of the Supervisory Board (since 2009)
 Ifo Institute for Economic Research, Member of the Board of Trustees (since 1998)
 Southeast Europe Association (SOG), Vice President (1998-2006)

Political positions 
In June 2017, Kalb voted against Germany's introduction of same-sex marriage.

Personal life
Kalb is a Roman Catholic; he is married and has two children.

References

External links
 Personal website
 Kalb, Bartholomäus; Bundestag
 Kalb, Bartholomäus; abgeordnetenwatch.de

Living people
1949 births
Members of the Bundestag for Bavaria
Members of the Landtag of Bavaria
People from Dingolfing-Landau
Members of the Bundestag 2013–2017
Members of the Bundestag 2009–2013
Members of the Bundestag 2005–2009
Members of the Bundestag 2002–2005
Members of the Bundestag 1998–2002
Members of the Bundestag 1994–1998
Members of the Bundestag 1990–1994
Members of the Bundestag for the Christian Social Union in Bavaria